Buddha Collapsed out of Shame is a 2007 Iranian film directed by Hana Makhmalbaf. The title is taken from her father Mohsen Makhmalbaf's book The Buddha Was Not Demolished in Afghanistan, It Collapsed Out of Shame. The story takes place in modern Afghanistan following the removal of the Taliban and revolves around a 5-year-old Afghan girl who wants to attend a newly opened school. The girl Bakhtay (Nikbakht Noruz) lives in the caves under the remains of the Buddhas of Bamiyan which were destroyed by the Taliban in 2001. Bakhtay becomes obsessed with the idea of going to school but must fight against a society influenced by conditions suffered during the strict Taliban rule including male domination, war, poverty, violence and dire children's games.

References

External links

2007 films
Iranian drama films
2000s Persian-language films
Hazaragi-language films
2007 drama films
Hazara people-related films
Films about education
2000s feminist films
2000s high school films